Urva may refer to:
 Urva (genus), a genus of animals
 Urva, Azerbaijan, a village in Azerbaijan
 Urva, Pınarbaşı, a village in Turkey
 , a river in Russia, ultimately draining into the Kama

See also
 Urwa (disambiguation)